Catasigerpes is a subgenus of praying mantis in the family Hymenopodidae.

See also
List of mantis genera and species

References

 
Acromantinae
Mantodea of Africa
Insect subgenera